Myeloid leukemia is a type of leukemia affecting myeloid tissue.

Types include:
 Acute myeloid leukemia
 Chronic myelogenous leukemia
 Acute megakaryoblastic leukemia
 Blastic plasmacytoid dendritic cell neoplasm

See also
 Hematological malignancies
 Myeloblast
 transient myeloproliferative disease

External links 

 
Leukemia

lt:Mieloma